Alexander Stanislavovich "Sasha" Bublik (born 17 June 1997) is a Russian-born Kazakhstani professional tennis player. He has been ranked as high as world No. 30 in singles by the Association of Tennis Professionals (ATP), which he achieved in February 2022, and is the current Kazakhstani No. 1 player. Bublik also has a career-high doubles ranking of world No. 47, attained on 8 November 2021.

In November 2016, Bublik announced he would change his citizenship from that of his home country of Russia to Kazakhstan after receiving support from the Kazakhstan Tennis Federation that the Russian Tennis Federation allegedly did not provide him. Since turning professional, Bublik has won one ATP Tour singles title and been a runner-up in four additional finals, and he achieved his greatest success at a Grand Slam at the 2021 French Open as the runner-up in his first career doubles final with partner Andrey Golubev. At , Bublik is known for his powerful serve and led the 2021 ATP Tour in the number of aces served in the season. His occasional use of unpredictable trick shots and the underarm serve has also led him to develop a reputation on tour as a player with a capricious game style.

Career
Alexander Stanislavovich Bublik was born on 17 June 1997 in Gatchina, Russia and began playing tennis at the age of four. He was coached by his father, Stanislav. On the junior tour, Bublik reached a career-high ranking of No. 19 and won eleven titles (six singles and five doubles) on the International Tennis Federation (ITF) junior circuit.

In 2016, Bublik joined several other players by switching to playing for Kazakhstan, explaining: 

In 2023, Bublik was named as a reserve member of the Levitov Chess Wizards team in the Professional Rapid Online Chess League.

2016: Futures titles and first ATP wins
Bublik began 2016 ranked World No. 964. He won his first Futures title in Doha in April 2016, followed by titles in Moscow, St. Petersburg, and Sweden.
 
Bublik made his ATP main-draw debut at the 2016 St. Petersburg Open, where he received wildcards into both the singles and doubles main draw.

Bublik qualified for the Kremlin Cup, where he notched the biggest win of his career, upsetting the top seed and world No. 13 Roberto Bautista Agut in straight sets in the round of 16. He then lost a tight three-set match to the eventual champion Pablo Carreño Busta.

In November 2016, Bublik announced that he would represent Kazakhstan.

By the end of the year, Bublik's ranking had skyrocketed 759 places to No. 205.

2017: Two Challenger titles and top-100 breakthrough
After qualifying for the Australian Open, Bublik defeated 16th-seeded Lucas Pouille in his first Grand Slam match.

In February, Bublik won his first Challenger title at the Morelos Open, defeating Nicolas Jarry in the final.

At Wimbledon, Bublik received a spot in the main draw as a lucky loser. He was defeated by world No. 1 Andy Murray in his first Wimbledon appearance.

Bublik won his second Challenger title in Aptos. In September, after making the semifinals of a Challenger tournament in Istanbul, Bublik broke into the top 100 for the first time, reaching a career-high ranking of No. 95.

2018: Struggles with form
Bublik struggled for much of the 2018 season, seeing his ranking drop into the 200s. However, he prevailed in his last event of the year, winning eight matches to capture the Challenger title in Bratislava.

2019: Two ATP Finals, top-50 debut

Bublik was successful early on in 2019, winning his fourth Challenger title in Budapest, followed shortly by another title at Pau.

Bublik earned his first Masters 1000 win in Miami, winning two qualifying matches and defeating Tennys Sandgren in a third-set tiebreak.

His next tournament was in Monterrey, where he again defeated Sandgren in a third-set tiebreak en route to his sixth Challenger title. This win propelled Bublik back into the top 100.

Bublik won his first Roland Garros main-draw match over Rudolf Molleker, before losing a close four-set contest to eventual finalist Dominic Thiem.

At the tournament in Newport, Bublik reached his first ATP final, where he was defeated by the top seed John Isner.

Bublik had a successful US Open campaign, where he won two consecutive five-set matches. He came back from two sets to love down against Thomas Fabbiano to reach his first Grand Slam third round.

Bublik reached his second ATP 250 final of the season in Chengdu, where he defeated top-30 players Taylor Fritz and Grigor Dimitrov, before losing the final in a third-set tiebreak to Pablo Carreño Busta. The result helped him to reach a new career-high of No. 48 in November.

2020: First Grand Slam doubles semifinal, first top-10 singles win

At the 2020 Australian Open Bublik reached his first semifinal at a Grand Slam in doubles partnering fellow Kazakh Mikhail Kukushkin where they lost to Rajeev Ram/Joe Salisbury.

Bublik reached the semifinals of Marseille, where he lost to Stefanos Tsitsipas in straight sets. As a lucky loser, Bublik reached the quarterfinals of Hamburg, beating Albert Ramos Viñolas and Félix Auger-Aliassime, before losing to Cristian Garín in 3 sets.

He had his first top-10 victory against Gaël Monfils at the 2020 French Open, but lost to Lorenzo Sonego in the second round.

2021: Two ATP singles finals & top-35 debut, historic French Open doubles final & top-50 debut
Bublik started his 2021 season at the Antalya Open. Seeded eighth, he reached his third ATP 250 final, notching his second top-10 victory against top seed and world No. 10, Matteo Berrettini, in the quarterfinals. He was forced to retire in the final after trailing 0–2 in the first set against Alex de Minaur.

In the Great Ocean Road Open, he lost in the third round to Stefano Travaglia. At the Australian Open, he lost in the second round to Dušan Lajović in 4 sets.

He reached his fourth final in Singapore after beating Altuğ Çelikbilek, Yoshihito Nishioka and Radu Albot. He lost to Alexei Popyrin in the final, 6–4 0–6, 2–6.

At the 2021 Miami Open, Bublik reached the quarterfinals where he lost to Jannik Sinner. This marked his best result at a Masters 1000 event to date.

At the 2021 Madrid Open, he defeated Denis Shapovalov and Aslan Karatsev to equal his previous Masters 1000 result, but lost to Casper Ruud. As a result, he achieved his career-high ranking of World No. 40 on 10 May 2021.

In only his sixth appearance at a Grand Slam in doubles, Bublik reached his second Grand Slam doubles semifinal in his career at the 2021 French Open partnering with fellow Kazakh Andrey Golubev defeating No. 5 seeded Ivan Dodig/Filip Polášek (second round), No. 11 seeded Wesley Koolhof/Jean-Julien Rojer (third round) and Hugo Nys/Tim Pütz (quarterfinals) en route, his best showing at this Grand Slam. In the semifinal the Kazakh duo defeated the Spanish duo Pablo Andújar/Pedro Martínez who were both making their Grand Slam semifinals doubles debut. They played in the final against the French home favorites Nicolas Mahut/Pierre-Hugues Herbert, but they lost 6−4, 6−7, 4−6. As a result, he entered the top 50 in doubles at World No. 49 on 14 June 2021.

2022: First ATP singles title & top-5 win, top 30, 100th career win
Bublik started his 2022 season at the Adelaide International 2. Seeded sixth, he lost in the first round to Australian wildcard Aleksandar Vukic. Ranked 37 at the Australian Open, he was defeated in the second round by 17th seed and world No. 20, Gaël Monfils.

In February, Bublik reached his fifth ATP singles final at the Open Sud de France in Montpellier. Seeded sixth, he defeated Tallon Griekspoor, qualifier Pierre-Hugues Herbert, second seed Roberto Bautista Agut, and fifth seed Filip Krajinović en route to the final. There, he defeated top seed and world No. 3, Alexander Zverev, to earn his first career win over a top-five player, as well as his first ATP singles title. At the Rotterdam Open, he was eliminated from the tournament in the first round by Andy Murray. Seeded seventh at the Qatar ExxonMobil Open, he lost in the second round to Arthur Rinderknech. In Dubai, he was beaten in the first round by fifth seed and world No. 11, Hubert Hurkacz. Seeded 31st at the Indian Wells Masters, he beat 2009 finalist and former world No. 1, Andy Murray, in the second round. He lost in the third round to 33rd seed and last year semifinalist, Grigor Dimitrov. Seeded 30th at the Miami Open, he was defeated in the third round by sixth seed, world No. 8, and eventual finalist, Casper Ruud.

Bublik started his clay-court season at the Monte-Carlo Masters. He beat 2014 champion, Stan Wawrinka, in the first round for his first win at this event. He retired during his second-round match against 13th seed and world No. 19, Pablo Carreño Busta, for no obvious reason. Seeded 16th at the Barcelona Open, he was beaten in the second round by Emil Ruusuvuori. Last year quarterfinalist at the Madrid Open, he lost in the first round to Miomir Kecmanović. Due to not defending his quarterfinalist points from last year, Bublik's ranking fell from 33 to 41. In Rome, he was defeated in the first round by lucky loser Marcos Giron. Seeded eighth at the Geneva Open, he was beaten in the first round by Kamil Majchrzak. Ranked 42 at the French Open, he lost in the second round to 28th seed Miomir Kecmanović.

Bublik started his grass-court season at the BOSS Open in Stuttgart. Seeded seventh, he lost in the second round to eventual finalist, Andy Murray. At the Queen's Club Championships, he was defeated in the second round by seventh seed, world No. 17, and two-time champion, Marin Čilić. In Eastbourne, he beat seventh seed, Frances Tiafoe, in the first round. He was eliminated in the quarterfinals by third seed, world No. 14, 2019 champion, and eventual champion, Taylor Fritz. Ranked 38 at Wimbledon, he reached the third round where he lost to 23rd seed, Frances Tiafoe, in four sets.

After Wimbledon, Bublik competed at the Hall of Fame Open. Seeded third, he beat sixth seed, Andy Murray, in the quarterfinals. He then defeated Jason Kubler in the semifinals to reach his 6th ATP singles final, his 2nd ATP singles final of the year, and his 2nd Hall of Fame Open final. He lost in a thrilling final to fourth seed Maxime Cressy.

In August, Bublik played at the National Bank Open. He lost in the first round to Jenson Brooksby. Bublik then missed the Western & Southern Open, and the Winston-Salem Open due to the birth of his son Vasily. Ranked No. 47 at the US Open, he was defeated in the second round by 12th seed, world No. 15, and two-time semifinalist, Pablo Carreño Busta.
In October at the first edition of the Firenze Open, he defeated in the first round Cristian Garin for his 100th career match win. He was the second man representing Kazakhstan to record 100 tour-level wins in his career, after Mikhail Kukushkin, who had 172.

National representation

Davis Cup
Bublik has participated three times in the Kazakhstan Davis Cup team since 2019 and as of 2022, he has a win–loss record of 9–4 in singles and 3–2 in doubles in Davis Cup competition. In 2021, he elaborated on his motivation when playing at the Davis Cup by explaining, "I take Davis Cup more seriously than [the] singles Tour because I'm not only playing for myself, but I play for the country, for the fans, and it's extra." Despite his more sporadic record on the ATP Tour, Bublik reiterated that, "In Davis Cup, I don't have 30 weeks to have good behaviour, bad behaviour, good match or bad match. I think I just go on court and try to be the best now, do what I can do now at the special moment."

He made his Davis Cup debut at the 2019 qualifying round in his singles match against Portugals João Sousa, where he won in three sets to help Kazakhstan advance to the 2019 Finals. At the Finals, Bublik narrowly lost to Robin Haase of the Netherlands in three sets, but he teamed up with Mikhail Kukushkin to win the deciding doubles match against Haase and Jean-Julien Rojer and seal their first tie win. In Kazakhstan's tie against Great Britain, Bublik played his second singles match, where he defeated Dan Evans, but he lost his doubles match with Kukushkin to Jamie Murray and Neal Skupski. With the loss against Great Britain, Kazakhstan lost in the group stage and thus, ended their campaign.

Bublik played the following year's qualifying round, where they faced off against Netherlands once more. He won his first singles match against Tallon Griekspoor and his second against Haase, both in straight sets, and brought his team through to the 2021 Finals. At the Finals, Bublik took on Swedens Mikael Ymer and won in three sets to help his team win the tie. He maintained his momentum against Canadas Vasek Pospisil in their next tie to win in straight sets to bring Kazakhstan to its sixth quarterfinal at the Davis Cup. There, Bublik succumbed to Serbias Novak Djokovic in straight sets and the team ultimately lost its tie to end their campaign.

In 2022, Representing Kazakhstan at the Davis Cup tie versus Norway, he won both of his matches beating Viktor Durasovic and Casper Ruud. In the end, Kazakhstan won the tie over Norway 3-1. After the US Open, Bublik represented Kazakhstan in the Davis Cup Group stage. Kazakhstan is in Group D alongside The Netherlands, the USA, and Great Britain. Against the Netherlands, he lost to Botic van de Zandschulp; however, he won the doubles tie with Aleksandr Nedovyesov beating Wesley Koolhof /Matwé Middelkoop. The Netherlands won the tie over Kazakhstan 2-1. Against the USA, he lost to Taylor Fritz, but he won doubles again with Nedovyesov defeating Rajeev Ram/Jack Sock. The USA ended up winning the tie 2-1.

Olympics
At the 2020 Summer Olympics, Bublik made his tennis Olympics debut, where he played Russia's Daniil Medvedev in the first round and lost in straight sets.

Playing style
At , Bublik possesses a powerful serve and led the 2021 ATP Tour in the number of aces served throughout the season. His unpredictable game style on court has often caught opponents off-guard through his occasional use of the underarm serve and tendency to add trick shots in his matches. His style has drawn comparisons to that of Nick Kyrgios, who also developed a reputation for often playing in an unorthodox manner.

Bublik is also known for his irreverence to the sport and casual approach to practicing. Bublik described his unprecedented run to the 2021 French Open doubles final as a "pure accident", and explained that he did not treat doubles as professional tennis, but as a way to "make some extra money, hang around, make some jokes." In a 2020 interview with L'Équipe, Bublik also stated that he lamented the sport and that the financial incentives were what kept him going: "If there was no money, I would stop playing tennis instantly. I haven’t earned enough money, in any other case I would have already retired". However, in 2022, he contradicted these statements, saying for Good Morning Tennis that "over time, and it’s been three years since that interview, things have changed a lot and [he] love playing tennis now because [he] realized that’s what [he] wanted to do as a kid".

Performance timelines

Singles
Current through the 2022 Miami Open.

Doubles

Significant finals

Grand Slam tournament finals

Doubles: 1 (1 runner-up)

Asian Games

Doubles 1 (1 runner-up)

ATP career finals

Singles: 7 (1 title, 6 runner-ups)

Doubles: 1 (1 runner-up)

Challenger and Futures finals

Singles: 11 (10 titles, 1 runner-up)

Doubles: 7 (3 titles, 4 runners-up)

Record against other players

Record against top-10 players
Bublik's record against players who have been ranked in the top 10, with those who are active in boldface. Only ATP Tour main draw matches are considered:

Top-10 wins
He has a  record against players who were, at the time the match was played, ranked in the top 10.

:*

References

External links 

 
 
 
 
 
 

1997 births
Living people
Russian male tennis players
Kazakhstani male tennis players
Russian emigrants to Kazakhstan
Naturalised citizens of Kazakhstan
Naturalised tennis players
People from Gatchina
Asian Games silver medalists for Kazakhstan
Tennis players at the 2018 Asian Games
Medalists at the 2018 Asian Games
Asian Games medalists in tennis
Olympic tennis players of Kazakhstan
Tennis players at the 2020 Summer Olympics
Sportspeople from Leningrad Oblast